Carlos Alberto da Silva (born 8 June 1974) is a retired Portuguese athlete who specialized in the 400 metres hurdles.

He finished fourth at the 1998 European Championships. He also competed at the 1994 European Championships in Athletics, the 1995 World Championships, the 1996 Olympic Games, the 1999 World Championships and the 2002 European Championships without reaching the final. His personal best time was 48.77 seconds, achieved in August 1999 in Zürich.

During the indoor season he competed in the 400 metres. He finished fifth at the 1995 World Indoor Championships and at the 1998 European Indoor Championships. His personal best time was 46.11 seconds, achieved in May 1996 in Lisboa.

References

1974 births
Living people
Portuguese male hurdlers
Athletes (track and field) at the 1996 Summer Olympics
Olympic athletes of Portugal